The Liga Portugal 2, also known as Liga Portugal 2 SABSEG for sponsorship reasons, is the second-highest division of the Portuguese football league system. At the end of each season, the two top-finishing teams are promoted to the top-tier Primeira Liga and the two lowest-ranked teams are relegated to the third-tier league. Starting with the 2021–22 season, relegated teams will no longer compete in the Campeonato de Portugal, which will become the fourth tier, but in a newly created third-level competition named Liga 3 (League 3).

The division began in 1990 as the Segunda Divisão de Honra (Second Division of Honour), superseding the Segunda Divisão (Segunda Divisão) as the second tier of Portuguese football. When the division came under the auspices of the Liga Portuguesa de Futebol Profissional (LPFP) in 1999, it was renamed the Segunda Liga (Second League), a name that was kept until 2016, except between 2005 and 2012, when it was known as the Liga de Honra (League of Honour). Rebranded as LigaPro in 2016, the competition assumed its current naming in the early stages of the 2020–21 season.

As of the 2018–19 season, it is contested nationwide by 18 teams, including the reserve sides (B teams) of several top-flight clubs. Twenty different teams have won the division title; the most successful is Paços de Ferreira, with four wins, including the inaugural season and the most recently concluded 2018–19 season.

History 
Before 1990, there was only one professional nationwide football league in Portugal, the Primeira Divisão (First Division). Lower placed teams were relegated to the Segunda Divisão (Second Division), a regional league, while the top teams from that league were promoted to the First Division. Starting with the 1990–91 season, a new second-tier professional league was created, taking the name Segunda Divisão de Honra, while the previous Segunda Divisão became the third-tier league and was renamed Segunda Divisão B.

In 1999, the Portuguese League for Professional Football (LPFP) took control of the two nationwide levels and renamed the league Segunda Liga (Second League), while in 2005 it was renamed Liga de Honra and the Segunda Divisão B reverted to its original name. In 2012, the second tier of Portuguese football was renamed again Segunda Liga and in 2016 it was renamed LigaPro.

Format 
In the 2016–17 season, there were 22 clubs in the Segunda Liga (24 in the seasons before). Then the number of teams was reduced every season until it reached 18 teams in the 2018–19 season.
During the course of a season, each club plays every other team twice — once at their home stadium and once at their opponent's — for a total of 34 games. At the end of each season, the two top teams are promoted to the Primeira Liga and the two lowest ranked teams will be relegated to the new Liga 3 (previously they were relegated to Campeonato de Portugal). There will be also a two-legged promotion/relegation play-off involving the 16th placed teams of Primeira Liga and 3rd placed team from Liga Portugal 2. The B teams cannot be promoted to Primeira Liga but can be demoted if they end the season in one of the relegation positions or if the main team is also relegated.

Broadcasting 
Since 2018–19, all the matches are broadcast by Sport TV, though some of them are only broadcast through online streaming. The exceptions are Benfica B and Porto B home games, broadcast by Benfica TV and Porto Canal.

Clubs

Stadia and locations

Champions

Statistics

Performance by club

All-time table
The all-time Liga Portugal 2 table is an overall record of all match results, points, and goals of every team that has played in Liga Portugal 2 since its inception in 1990. The table is accurate as of the end of the 2021–22 season. 2019–20 league standings are not attributed due to the competition being abandoned. For comparison, older seasons have been calculated according to the three-points-per-win rule.

References

External links
Official webpage 
 

 
2
Portugal
1990 establishments in Portugal
Recurring sporting events established in 1990
Professional sports leagues in Portugal